Weird Loners is an American sitcom that was created by Michael J. Weithorn.  The 6-episode first season was ordered straight-to-series by the Fox network in 2014.  The series is executive produced by Weithorn and Jake Kasdan. The series premiered on March 31, 2015.

On May 11, 2015, Fox canceled the series after one season. Kevin Reilly, the network President who had ordered the series from Weithorn's spec script in 2013, was fired a few months later leaving the series without a champion at the network.

Premise
Four people who fear personal relationships are unexpectedly thrust into one another's lives and form an unlikely bond while living in a townhouse in Queens, New York.

Cast
Becki Newton as Caryn Goldfarb, a high-strung dental hygienist who was engaged to be married but suddenly decides to call off her engagement after a brief fling with Stosh.
Zachary Knighton as Stosh Lewandowski, Eric's sleazy cousin, whose womanizing lifestyle has recently cost him his job. With no job and nowhere to live, he is forced to move in with his cousin Eric.
Nate Torrence as Eric Lewandowski, a toll collector who is suddenly on his own for the first time after his father unexpectedly passes away. After the funeral, his estranged cousin Stosh offers to move in with him.
Meera Rohit Kumbhani as Zara Sandhu, an angst-ridden artist, who befriends Eric after he buys one of her paintings.

Recurring
Susie Essman as Evelyn Goldfarb, Caryn's mother.
David Wain as Howard, Caryn's ex-fiancé.

Critical reception
Weird Loners received mixed reviews, with Rotten Tomatoes giving the series a score of 44% based on reviews from 25critics and an average rating of 5.5 out of 10. The website’s consensus reads: " Weird Loners strands its veteran stars in an overly familiar sitcom structure burdened with a preponderance of humdrum humor."

Neil Genzlinger of The New York Times gave the series a positive review, stating: "[Weird Loners is] not loud or frenetic. It’s not particularly cutting-edge. It’s just funny, in a relaxed way that’s welcome somehow in a television spectrum full of pushiness and intensity."

Gwen Ihnat of The A.V. Club wrote a positive review giving the series a "B+" grade. She observed that "What Weird Loners has in its corner is an appealing cast and some hard-hitting TV vets" and remarked that "Since [Jake] Kasdan and [Michael J.] Weithorn both know their way around a sitcom set, it’s not a surprise that Weird Loners soon adds more gravity than most new shows boast from right out of the gate."

Episodes

References

External links

2010s American single-camera sitcoms
2015 American television series debuts
2015 American television series endings
English-language television shows
Fox Broadcasting Company original programming
Television series by 20th Century Fox Television
Television shows set in New York City